2017–18 Wisła Kraków season was the 78th season in the Ekstraklasa and the 64th season in the Polish Cup. The season was from 15 June 2017 to 14 June 2018.

On 1 January 2018 Wisła hired new manager Joan Carrillo. The season was the last for club legends Arkadiusz Głowacki and Paweł Brożek. The farewell of both players took place on 13 May 2018 during the match with Lech Poznań.

Season review

Sponsors

Transfers

Summer transfer window

Arrivals 
 The following players moved to Wisła.

Departures
 The following players moved from Wisła.

Winter transfer window

Arrivals 

 The following players moved to Wisła.

Departures
 The following players moved from Wisła.

Coaching staff

Competitions

Preseason  and friendlies

Ekstraklasa

Results summary

Regular season

Championship round

Results by round

Regular season

Championship Round

Regular season

Championship Round

Polish Cup

Squad and statistics

Appearances, goals and discipline

Goalscorers

Disciplinary record

References

Wisła Kraków seasons
Wisła Kraków